The Samyang 8mm f/3.5 fisheye is a fisheye photographic lens using the stereographic projection and is designed for crop factor APS-C DSLRs.  It is made in South Korea by Samyang Optics and marketed under several brand names, including Rokinon.

The lens uses manual focus only.  For most versions of the lens, the aperture must be set manually. For Nikon there are versions with and without a chip to communicate aperture information with the camera.  Versions with the chip (model AE8M-N) can set the aperture automatically.  The CS version of the lens has a fixed lens hood.

References

External links

008
Fisheye lenses